Antonio Vega may refer to:

 Antonio Vega (footballer) (born 1982), Chilean footballer 
 Antonio Vega (singer) (1957–2009), Spanish singer
 Antonio Vega (sport shooter) (1932–2011), Spanish former sport shooter
 Antonio Vega Corona, (born 1965), Mexican politician
 Antonio Vega (character), character from the American soap opera One Life to Live, played by Kamar de los Reyes and Robert Montano